In organic chemistry, the Le Bel–Van 't Hoff rule states that the number of stereoisomers of an organic compound containing no internal planes of symmetry is 2n, where n represents the number of asymmetric carbon atoms. Joseph Achille Le Bel and Jacobus Henricus van 't Hoff both announced this hypothesis in 1874 and that this accounted for all molecular asymmetry known at the time.

As an example, four of the carbon atoms of the aldohexose class of molecules are asymmetric, therefore the Le Bel–Van 't Hoff rule gives a calculation of 24 = 16 stereoisomers. This is indeed the case: these chemicals are two enantiomers each of eight different diastereomers: allose, altrose, glucose, mannose, gulose, idose, galactose, and talose.

References

Stereochemistry
Jacobus Henricus van 't Hoff